Kliprand is a town in West Coast District Municipality in the Western Cape province of South Africa. It is the setting for the book, October  by  Zoë Wicomb

References

Populated places in the Matzikama Local Municipality